Rémy Gorgé (18 June 1923 – 20 December 2015) was a Swiss national whose career in international peacekeeping with the United Nations spanned more than three decades.

He served as senior and Principal Legal Advisor to various United Nations bodies involved in peacekeeping operations (see below) and also undertook numerous special peacekeeping missions on behalf of the incumbent Secretary General at the time; primarily relating to political disturbances in Cyprus, Iraq and Iran and, the Middle East in General (see below).

Timeline of Different Roles
1947	Doctor iuris utriusque, magna cum laude
University of Berne, Switzerland

1947	International Committee of the Red Cross, Geneva

1948-1952	International Refugee Organization, Geneva
		Legal advisor (1948 – 1950)
		Deputy General Council (1951 – 1952)

1952 – 1953	Inter-Governmental Committee for European Migration,        general		Acting General Counsel

1953 – 1956	United Nations Korean Reconstruction Agency, New York
Senior Legal Adviser (also in charge of chartering and investments)

1956 – 1957	United Nations Truce Supervision Organization (Palestine)
		Jerusalem
		Senior Legal Adviser

1958 – 1959	United Nations Emergency Force, Gaza
		Senior Legal and Political Adviser

1960 		Legal Affairs, United Nations Headquarters, New York
		Senior Legal Officer

1960 – 1963	International Atomic Energy Agency, Vienna
		Senior Legal Adviser

1963 – 1964	United Nations Operations Congo, Leopoldville
		Principal Legal Adviser and Political Adviser

1965		International Atomic Energy Agency, Vienna
		Senior Legal Officer

1965 – 1971	United Nations Peace-Keeping Force in Cyprus (UNFICYP)
		Senior Legal and Political Adviser

1971 – 1973	United Nations Truce Supervision Organization, Jerusalem
		Principal Political Adviser

1973-1974	United Nations Emergency Force, Cairo
		Principal Political Adviser

1974 - 		United Nations Peace-Keeping Force in Cyprus (UNFICYP)
		Senior Political and Legal Adviser

1978		Acting Special Representative of the Secretary-General in Cyprus

1978 – 1981	Deputy Special Representative of the Secretary-General in Cyprus

Special Missions

1960		Legal Adviser of the United Nations Tin Conference, New York

1961		Legal Adviser of the United Nations Sugar Conference, Geneva

1962		Legal Adviser to Special Representatives of United Nations 
Secretary-General at talks between Messrs. Adoula and Tschombe, Leopoldville

1963		Legal Adviser of the United Nations Sugar Conference, London

1964	Representative of the United Nations Secretary-General on joint mission with representative of the High Commissioner for Refugees, Burundi, Rwanda and Kivu (Congo)

1965	Legal Adviser at United Nations Tin Conference, New York

1970	Member of Secretariat Mission to Guinea, appointed by the Secretary-General (Cancelled by Government of Guinea before arrival in mission area)

1972	Aide to United Nations Under-Secretary-General for Special Political Affairs in consultations with Greek and Turkish Governments

1973	Aide to United Nations Under-Secretary-General for Special Political Affairs in consultations with Syrian and Israeli Governments

1974	Aide to United Nations Under-Secretary-General for Special Political Affairs at Geneva Conference on Cyprus

1975 – 1980	Number of Missions to Greece and Turkey, accompanying Special Representative of the Secretary-General and, in January 1978, the Secretary-General of the United Nations

1980 – 1981	Peace Missions to Iraq and Iran, accompanying Prime Minister Olof Palme, United Nations Special Representative

1982	Special missions (2) for Secretary-General of the United Nations to Lebanon and Israel during hostilities.

References

1923 births
2015 deaths
Swiss diplomats
United Nations-related lists
Swiss expatriates in the United States
Swiss expatriates in Austria
Swiss expatriates in the Democratic Republic of the Congo
Swiss expatriates in Cyprus
Swiss expatriates in Egypt